The White Rock Whalers are a junior "B" ice hockey team based in White Rock, British Columbia, Canada. They are members of the Tom Shaw Conference of the Pacific Junior Hockey League (PJHL). The Whalers play their home games at Centennial Arena. Jason Rogers is the teams Director of Hockey Operations.

Background

The Whalers joined the league in 2018-19 as an expansion team They played their first regular season game on September 8, 2018 against the Richmond Sockeyes. Matt Rogers was named as the franchises first ever captain.

Season-by-season record

Note: GP = Games played, W = Wins, L = Losses, T = Ties, OTL = Overtime Losses, Pts = Points, GF = Goals for, GA = Goals against

Playoffs

Awards and trophies

PJHL Coach of the Year
2019-20 PJHL season | Jason Rogers

References

External links
Official website of the White Rock Whalers

Pacific Junior Hockey League teams
Ice hockey teams in British Columbia
Ice hockey clubs established in 2018
2018 establishments in British Columbia
Junior ice hockey teams in Canada